Harlan Anderson (October 15, 1929 - January 30, 2019) was an American engineer and entrepreneur, best known as the co-founder of Digital Equipment Corporation (DEC), which later became the second largest computer company in the world. Other notable entities that Anderson has been associated with include Lincoln Laboratory at the Massachusetts Institute of Technology, where he was a member of the technical staff. He served as Director of Technology for Time, Inc., where he spearheaded their evaluation of the future of the printed word during the explosion of television, long before the Internet existed.

Anderson participated in early stage financing for over 20 small technology companies. He was a trustee of Rensselaer Polytechnic Institute (RPI) for 16 years. He was a member of the Board of Advisors of the College of Engineering at the University of Illinois, and a trustee of the Boston Symphony Orchestra.

Anderson was the author of the autobiography entitled, Learn, Earn & Return:  My Life as a Computer Pioneer.

Education 
Anderson earned both a B.S. and M.S. in Physics from the University of Illinois at Urbana–Champaign in the early 1950s, where he became interested in computers. He took programming courses for the ILLIAC I computer, which was under construction at this time. The courses were taught by the computer pioneer, David Wheeler of the University of Cambridge Computer Laboratory. He received a B.S. degree in Engineering Physics and a Masters in Physics in 1951 and 1952 respectively.

Digital Equipment Corporation
In 1957, Anderson and Ken Olsen, his boss at Lincoln Laboratory, decided to start their own firm. They approached American Research and Development Corporation, an early venture capital firm, which had been founded by Georges Doriot, and founded Digital Equipment Corporation after receiving $70,000 for a 70% share. They rented space in what had been a woolen mill building in Maynard, Massachusetts. Anderson was employee #2. He departed DEC in 1966 after a dispute with Olsen about the management structure of the company.

References

External links
 The Demise of Digital Equipment Corporation: What made the difference at DEC?
 The Mouse That Roared: PDP-1 Celebration Event panel, 15 May 2006.
 "Remembering DEC: Memoir from Co-Founder Harlan Anderson Due Out in November" Boston Globe, October 22, 2009
 "A Personal Take on the Rise and Fall of Digital" Boston Globe, October 26, 2009

1929 births
2019 deaths
Digital Equipment Corporation people
21st-century American engineers
Grainger College of Engineering alumni
MIT Lincoln Laboratory people